Hira Aur Patthar is a 1977 Hindi-language film directed by Vijay Bhatt and starring Shashi Kapoor and Shabana Azmi.

Cast
Shashi Kapoor...Shankar 
Shabana Azmi...Gauri 
Asit Sen...Chanda's Father 
Ashok Kumar...Dr. Anand    
Bindu...Roopa Bai 
G. Asrani...Tota  
Bharat Bhushan ...Tulsiram
Ramesh Deo ... Gangaram

Soundtrack

External links
 

1977 films
1970s Hindi-language films
Films scored by Kalyanji Anandji
Films directed by Vijay Bhatt